The COVID-19 pandemic in Burundi is part of the ongoing worldwide pandemic of coronavirus disease 2019 caused by severe acute respiratory syndrome coronavirus 2. The virus was confirmed to have reached Burundi on 25 March 2020.

Background 
On 12 January 2020, the World Health Organization (WHO) confirmed that a novel coronavirus was the cause of a respiratory illness in a cluster of people in Wuhan City, Hubei Province, China, which was reported to the WHO on 31 December 2019.

The case fatality ratio for COVID-19 has been much lower than SARS of 2003, but the transmission has been significantly greater, with a significant total death toll. Model-based simulations for Burundi indicate that the 95% confidence interval for the time-varying reproduction number R t exceeded 1 during the first half of 2021 but diminished to around 0.7 during the second half of 2021.

Timeline

March 2020
 Burundi's Health Minister Thadée Ndikumana confirmed the country's first two cases of coronavirus disease 2019 on 31 March, Burundi nationals travelling back from Rwanda and Dubai respectively.

April to June 2020
 On 5 April, a further positive case was confirmed, a 39-year-old woman, while 7 other people tested negative. In total there were 20 new cases in April, bringing the number of confirmed cases to 18. One patient died (14 April) and 8 recovered, leaving 6 active cases at the end of the month.
 On 12 May, the foreign ministry of Burundi addressed a letter to WHO's Africa headquarters, ordering four officials coordinating the coronavirus response to leave the country. The letter said the four individuals "are declared persona non grata and as such, must leave the territory of Burundi" by 15 May. The health minister reportedly accuses WHO of "unacceptable interference in [the country's] management of the coronavirus".
 On 28 May, First Lady Denise Bucumi-Nkurunziza tested positive for COVID-19.
 There were 48 new cases in May, bringing the total number of confirmed cases to 63. The death toll remained unchanged. 29 cases were active at the end of the month.
 On 8 June, late President Pierre Nkurunziza died of what was described as a heart attack in a government statement. However, with government authorities accused of deliberately covering up the scope of the pandemic, and in the wake of unconfirmed reports that his wife was flown to Kenya 11 days before, having contracted COVID-19, some have speculated that the president died of COVID-19.
 There were 107 new cases in June, raising the total number of confirmed cases to 170. The death toll remained unchanged and the number of recovered patients rose to 115, leaving 54 active cases at the end of the month.

July to September 2020
 There were 217 new cases in July, bringing the total number of confirmed cases to 387. The death toll remained unchanged. The number of recovered patients increased by 189 to 304, leaving 82 active cases at the end of the month.
 There were 58 new cases in August, bringing the total number of confirmed cases to 445. The death toll remained unchanged. There were 87 active cases at the end of the month.
 There were 63 new cases in September, bringing the total number of confirmed cases to 508. The death toll remained unchanged. The number of recovered patients increased to 472, leaving 35 active cases at the end of the month.

October to December 2020
 There were 81 new cases in October, bringing the total number of confirmed cases to 589. The death toll remained unchanged. The number of recovered patients increased to 515, leaving 73 active cases at the end of the month.
 There were 99 new cases in November, bringing the total number of confirmed cases to 688. The death toll remained unchanged. The number of recovered patients increased to 575, leaving 112 active cases at the end of the month.
 Former president Pierre Buyoya died in Paris from COVID-19 on 17 December. There were 130 new cases in December, taking the total number of confirmed cases to 818. The death toll doubled to 2. The number of recovered patients increased to 687, leaving 129 active cases at the end of the month.

January to March 2021
 The number of confirmed cases doubled from December to January, taking the total number to 1632. The death toll remained unchanged. The number of recovered patients increased to 773, leaving 857 active cases at the end of the month.
 There were 377 new cases in February, taking the total number of confirmed cases to 2209. The death toll rose to 3. The number of recovered patients remained unchanged, leaving 1433 active cases at the end of the month.
 There were 633 new cases in March, taking the total number of confirmed cases to 2842. The death toll doubled to 6. The number of recovered patients increased to 1155, leaving 1681 active cases at the end of the month.

April to June 2021
 There were 1204 new cases in April, taking the total number of confirmed cases to 4046. The death toll remained unchanged. The number of recovered patients increased to 3682, leaving 358 active cases at the end of the month.
 There were 744 new cases in May, taking the total number of confirmed cases to 4790. The death toll remained unchanged. The number of recovered patients increased to 4471, leaving 213 active cases at the end of the month.
 There were 704 new cases in June, taking the total number of confirmed cases to 5494. The death toll rose to 8. The number of recovered patients increased to 5359, leaving 127 active cases at the end of the month.

July to September 2021
 There were 2011 new cases in July, taking the total number of confirmed cases to 7505. The death toll rose to 9.
 There were 4885 new cases in August, raising the total number of confirmed cases to 12390. The death toll rose to 10.
 There were 5881 new cases in September, raising the total number of confirmed cases to 18271. The death toll rose to 14. The number of recovered patients increased to 17459, leaving 798 active cases at the end of the month.

October to December 2021
 There were 1807 new cases in October, bringing the total number of confirmed cases to 20078. The death toll remained unchanged. The number of recovered patients increased to 19970, leaving 94 active cases at the end of the month.
 There were 337 new cases in November, bringing the total number of confirmed cases to 20415. The death toll remained unchanged. The number of recovered patients increased to 20303, leaving 98 active cases at the end of the month.
 There were 11200 new cases in December, bringing the total number of confirmed cases to 31615. The death toll remained unchanged. The number of recovered patients increased to 29588, leaving 2013 active cases at the end of the month. Modelling by WHO's Regional Office for Africa suggests that due to under-reporting, the true number of infections by the end of 2021 was around 5.3 million while the true number of COVID-19 deaths was around 149.

January to March 2022
 There were 5854 new cases in January, bringing the total number of confirmed cases to 37469. The death toll rose to 15. The number of recovered patients increased to 37175, leaving 279 active cases at the end of the month.
 There were 658 new cases in February, bringing the total number of confirmed cases to 38127. The death toll remained unchanged. The number of recovered patients increased to 38031, leaving 81 active cases at the end of the month.
 There were 448 new cases in March, bringing the total number of confirmed cases to 38575. The death toll remained unchanged. The number of recovered patients increased to 38375, leaving 185 active cases at the end of the month.

April to June 2022
 There were 1423 new cases in April, bringing the total number of confirmed cases to 39998. The death toll remained unchanged. The number of recovered patients increased to 39449, leaving 534 active cases at the end of the month.
 There were 2036 new cases in May, bringing the total number of confirmed cases to 42034. The death toll remained unchanged.
 There were 697 new cases in June, bringing the total number of confirmed cases to 42731. The death toll remained unchanged. The number of recovered patients increased to 42541, leaving 175 active cases at the end of the month.

July to September 2022
 There were 3544 new cases in July, bringing the total number of confirmed cases to 46275. The death toll remained unchanged. The number of recovered patients increased to 44918, leaving 1342 active cases at the end of the month.
 There were 3095 new cases in August, bringing the total number of confirmed cases to 49370. The death toll remained unchanged. The number of recovered patients increased to 48578, leaving 777 active cases at the end of the month.
 There were 823 new cases in September, bringing the total number of confirmed cases to 50193. The death toll remained unchanged.

October to December 2022
 There were 1147 new cases in October, bringing the total number of confirmed cases to 50517. The death toll remained unchanged. The number of recovered patients increased to 50259, leaving 243 active cases at the end of the month.
 There were 501 new cases in November, bringing the total number of confirmed cases to 51018. The death toll remained unchanged. The number of recovered patients increased to 50638, leaving 365 active cases at the end of the month.
 There were 1144 new cases in December, bringing the total number of confirmed cases to 52162. The death toll remained unchanged. The number of recovered patients increased to 51393, leaving 754 active cases at the end of the month.

January to March 2023
 There were 1330 new cases in January, bringing the total number of confirmed cases to 53492. The death toll remained unchanged. The number of recovered patients increased to 53394, leaving 73 active cases at the end of the month.

Statistics

Confirmed new cases per day

Confirmed deaths per day

Vaccinations

Through most of 2021, Burundi was one of three countries which refused to have vaccines. In February 2021, Thaddee Ndikumana, the health minister of Burundi, said his country was more concerned with prevention measures. "Since more than 95% of patients are recovering, we estimate that the vaccines are not yet necessary," local media reported. In October 2021, however, the Burundian government announced that it had received delivery of 500,000 doses of the Chinese Sinopharm BIBP vaccine. A targeted vaccination programme commenced on 18 October 2021.

Prevention
On 12 March, the government instituted 14-day quarantining for people entering Burundi from affected countries.

President Nkurunziza refused to impose restrictions on the country, permitting political rallies and sporting events to take place.

See also 
 COVID-19 pandemic in Africa
 COVID-19 pandemic by country and territory

References

 
COVID-19 pandemic
COVID-19 pandemic
Burundi
Burundi
Disease outbreaks in Burundi